The Eliza Ann Jewett Property is a home in Savannah, Georgia, United States. It is located at 18 East Jones Street and was constructed in 1847.

The building, located a block south of Madison Square, is part of the Savannah Historic District, and in a survey for the Historic Savannah Foundation, Mary Lane Morrison found the building to be of significant status.

It was built for Eliza Ann Jewett around the same time as the Joe Odom House next door (number 16), the two being amongst the earliest constructions on Jones Street.

See also
Buildings in Savannah Historic District

References

Houses in Savannah, Georgia
Houses completed in 1847
Savannah Historic District